Goodar Township is a civil township of Ogemaw County in the U.S. state of Michigan. As of the 2010 census, the township population was 493.

Communities
Goodar had its own post office from 1909–1914.
It was founded in 1887 and given a post office named Hunt on January 17, 1889. The post office was renamed South Branch on September 8, 1893. It had a station on the Detroit and Mackinac Railway. South Branch contains its own post office with the 48761 ZIP Code, which serves most of Goodar Township, as well as the southeastern portion of Mentor Township in Oscoda County to the north, small portions of Curtis Township and Mitchell Township to the northeast in Alcona County, and the northwest corner of Planfield Township in Iosco County to the east.

Geography

Demographics
As of the census of 2000, there were 493 people, 228 households, and 157 families residing in the township.  The population density was 14.0 per square mile (5.4/km2).  There were 543 housing units at an average density of 15.4 per square mile (5.9/km2).  The racial makeup of the township was 97.97% White, 0.41% Native American, 0.20% Asian, 0.41% Pacific Islander, 0.61% from other races, and 0.41% from two or more races. Hispanic or Latino of any race were 1.42% of the population.

There were 228 households, out of which 16.7% had children under the age of 18 living with them, 61.4% were married couples living together, 5.7% had a female householder with no husband present, and 31.1% were non-families. 26.8% of all households were made up of individuals, and 15.8% had someone living alone who was 65 years of age or older.  The average household size was 2.16 and the average family size was 2.59.

In the township the population was spread out, with 17.8% under the age of 18, 3.0% from 18 to 24, 17.8% from 25 to 44, 33.9% from 45 to 64, and 27.4% who were 65 years of age or older.  The median age was 53 years. For every 100 females, there were 89.6 males.  For every 100 females age 18 and over, there were 96.6 males.

The median income for a household in the township was $28,214, and the median income for a family was $30,139. Males had a median income of $26,250 versus $15,714 for females. The per capita income for the township was $14,052.  About 11.0% of families and 14.6% of the population were below the poverty line, including 14.3% of those under age 18 and 6.7% of those age 65 or over.

Images

References

External links
Goodar Township website

Townships in Ogemaw County, Michigan
Townships in Michigan
Populated places established in 1888
1888 establishments in Michigan